God Under Howard: The Rise of the Religious Right in Australian Politics (pbk ) is a 2005 book by Marion Maddox. Maddox argues that, from 1996, John Howard's Liberal Party slowly imported US Christian right values and that the Australian media reported little about this shift in social and public policy. Maddox suggests that the line between church and state became blurred, as happened in America.

See also
High and Dry (book)
The Times Will Suit Them

References

Australian non-fiction books
Books about politics of Australia
2005 non-fiction books
Books about John Howard